Wee Kim Wee   (4 November 1915 – 2 May 2005) was a Singaporean journalist and diplomat who served as the fourth president of Singapore from 1985 until his resignation in 1993. 

Prior to his presidency, Wee served as  Singapore's High Commissioner to Malaysia between 1973 and 1980, Ambassador to Japan between 1980 and 1984, and Ambassador to the Republic of Korea between 1981 and 1984 before being elected by the Parliament.

For the ensuing initial presidential election, the first in Singapore to be decided by popular vote, Wee decided not to contest and retired after his second term had ended. He is also the first president to exercise custodial powers pursuant to the constitutional amendments in the Singapore's history.

Wee died of prostate cancer in his home at Siglap Plain in Singapore on 2 May 2005, at the age of 89.

Early life and education
Born in Singapore on 4 November 1915, Wee Kim Wee was the son of Wee Choong Lay and Chua Hay Luan. His father Wee Choong Lay was a ship purser but went blind when Wee Kim Wee was six years old. His mother Chua Hay Luan was the younger sister of Chua Kim Teng, the father of Chua Jim Neo and maternal grandfather of Lee Kuan Yew. Wee lost his father when he was eight and his mother when he was nineteen. 

Wee attended Pearl's Hill School and Outram School before enrolling into Raffles Institution but dropped out at the age of 15.

Career

Journalism (1930–1973)
In 1930, Wee started out as a clerk working for the newspaper The Straits Times, before becoming a reporter focusing on political issues. He eventually became one of the paper's main reporters. He married his wife, Koh Sok Hiong in 1936 when he was a 21 years old reporter. 

In 1941, he joined the United Press Associations, and was its chief correspondent in the 1950s. He returned to The Straits Times in 1959, and was appointed deputy editor in Singapore. In 1963, he was awarded the Public Service Medal. 

In 1966, he interviewed the former Indonesian president Suharto, reporting the latter's intention to end the three-year confrontation with Malaysia (see Konfrontasi). He broke the news with a front-page headline using Suharto's own words: "Suharto: 'Peace: The sooner the better'". In 1973, he was awarded the Public Service Star as the editorial manager of the Straits Times.

Diplomacy (1973–1984)
Wee left journalism in 1973 to become Singapore High Commissioner to Malaysia, a position he held for seven years. He was later appointed Ambassador to Japan in September 1980, and to South Korea in February 1981. 

At the end of his diplomatic career in 1984, he was appointed Chairman of the Singapore Broadcasting Corporation, the predecessor of the current Mediacorp.

Presidency (1985–1993)
Wee was elected as the president of Singapore by Parliament in 1985 and was ex officio appointed Chancellor of the National University of Singapore and the Nanyang Technological University. 

Prior to Wee's second term as president, the selection of the presidential candidate was determined solely by the Parliament. During Wee's second term, the Parliament amended the constitution in 1991, to allow for an elected president, who could veto key political appointments and the use of government reserves.

The creation of an elected presidency was a major constitutional and political change in the country's history as under the revision, as the president is empowered to veto government budgets and appointments to public office. They can examine the government's exercise of its powers under the Internal Security Act and religious harmony laws and investigate cases of corruption.

For the ensuing initial presidential election, the first in Singapore to be decided by popular poll, Wee decided not to enter his candidacy and went into retirement upon the completion of his second and final term. He was also awarded the Darjah Utama Temasek in 1993.

Later years (1994–2004)
After leaving office, Wee was appointed as deputy registrar of marriages. He was later conferred an honorary Doctor of Letters degree by the National University of Singapore for his contributions to public service and his contributions to the University of Singapore as its chancellor till 1993.

Wee became the Director of Cathay Organisation Holdings in 1999.

In 2004, Wee published his autobiography, Glimpses and Reflections. From the royalties and other donations, half a million Singapore dollars were donated to eight charities.

Death and legacy
Wee died of prostate cancer in his home at Siglap Plain on 2 May 2005 at 5:10am SST at the age of 89. Before his death, he had asked to be cremated and for the ashes to be placed at Mandai Columbarium with those of ordinary citizens instead of Kranji State Cemetery, where late dignitaries are usually buried. His state funeral saw a large crowd who attended to pay their last respects at the Istana, where his body laid in state.

Wee was survived by his wife of 69 years, Koh Sok Hiong (1916–2018), their son Bill Wee Hock Kee (1936–2015), six daughters, 13 grandchildren, and 14 great-grandchildren.

In 2006, Nanyang Technological University renamed its School of Communication Studies after Wee to the Wee Kim Wee School of Communication and Information.

The Centre for Cross-Cultural Studies at Singapore Management University, renamed after Wee as the Wee Kim Wee Centre.

Wee Kim Wee Legacy Fund at Nanyang Technological University is named after him.

References

Bibliography
Wee Kim Wee (2004), Glimpses and Reflections. Landmark Books, Singapore. 
 On The Record: The Journalistic Legacy of President Wee Kim Wee. Nanyang Technological University, Singapore.  and 
 Wee Eng Hwa (2010), "Cooking For The President" - a cookbook of Peranakan recipes from Wee's wife, recorded by his daughter Wee Eng Hwa. The cookbook includes much details of Wee's personal life with photographs.
Speech by Wee Eng Hwa at the launch of Wee Kim Wee School Of Communication And Information, 5 December 2006 at The Istana, Singapore.
Former President Wee Kim Wee dies at the age of 89, Channel News Asia, 2 May 2005.

External links
Tribute Page to the Late Mr Wee Kim Wee
WEE KIM WEE

1915 births
2005 deaths
Singaporean Buddhists
Deaths from prostate cancer
Peranakan people in Singapore
Presidents of Singapore
Singaporean journalists
Singaporean politicians of Chinese descent
Deaths from cancer in Singapore
Raffles Institution alumni
High Commissioners of Singapore to Malaysia
Ambassadors of Singapore to Japan
Ambassadors of Singapore to South Korea
Honorary Knights Grand Cross of the Order of the Bath
Recipients of the Darjah Utama Temasek
20th-century journalists